Midnight Kiss may refer to:

Midnight Kiss (comics), a Markosia comics series by Tony Lee
Midnight Kiss (EP), a 2013 EP by Propellers, or its title track
"Midnight Kiss", a song by Gaelic Storm from the 2001 album Tree
 "Midnight Kiss" (Into the Dark), an episode of the second season of Into the Dark

See also
The Midnight Kiss, a 1926 film by Irving Cummings starring Janet Gaynor
That Midnight Kiss, a 1949 film starring Mario Lanza
That Midnight Kiss, a 1949 EP by Mario Lanza
"Un bacio a mezzanotte" ("A Kiss at Midnight"), a 1952 Italian song 
"Kiss Me at Midnight", a song by NSYNC from the 1998 album Home for Christmas